Royerton is an unincorporated community in Hamilton Township, Delaware County, Indiana.

History
Royerton was laid out in 1870 by John Royer.

Geography

References

Unincorporated communities in Delaware County, Indiana
Unincorporated communities in Indiana